Dagmawi Yimer (born 6 December 1977), is an Ethiopian-born Italian filmmaker. He is also the co-founder and vice president of the Archivio delle Memorie Migranti.

Personal life
He was born on 6 December 1977 in a small town Kirkos, Addis Ababa, Ethiopia. Before he left the country, he studied law in Addis Ababa in 2003.

Career
In 2005, he left Ethiopia due to strong post-political unrest. He left the home without notifying his father but only his mother and sister. He crossed the desert between the Sudan and Libya and later crossed Mediterranean in late July 2006. Finally he reached Italy after a perilous journey. He moved to Lampedusa and lived there since 30 July 2006. In May 2007, he attended to the video-narration course of the Asinitas association. During this period, he made his first documentary The Desert And the Sea in collaboration with Asinitas, Zalab and Aamod.

Meanwhile, he moved to linguistic and cultural mediation for the Asinitas Onlus association, within the same Italian school for asylum seekers, refugees and migrants. During his best years from 2007 to 2008, Yimer made the popular short films: Lo scabocchio, Le sagome, and Caravan. Then he made the short Welcome to your home together with Marco Carsetti. Then he was the co-author of biographical documentary Come un uomo sulla terra centered on migration from Libya to Europe. The film was produced by Asinitas Onlus, with the collaboration of Zalab. In 2009, Yimer received a Special Mention at BIF & ST for the documentary.

In 2011, he made the film Solo il mare, focused on the island of Lampedusa. Then in 2013, Yimer made Va 'Pensiero based on the cross story of two racist attacks in Milan and Florence. In 2015, he made two films: Asmat-Names and Benvenuti in Italia.

Filmography

References

External links
 
 Changing the Narrative of the World: Interview with Gabriele Del Grande and Dagmawi Yimer
 Artist talk with Dagmawi Yimer and Zakaria Mohamed Ali
 Long Journeys. African Migrants on the Road

Living people
Ethiopian people
People from Addis Ababa
Italian film directors
1977 births